The Forge Road Historic District is a historic district on Forge Road from Ives Road to the Potowomut River in Warwick, Rhode Island. A memorial to Greene stands near the bridge crossing the Potowomut River. Opposite the farm on Forge Road stand four houses, all of which date to the late 18th to mid-19th century.

The district was added to the National Register of Historic Places in 1984.

See also

National Register of Historic Places listings in Kent County, Rhode Island

References

Historic districts in Kent County, Rhode Island
Warwick, Rhode Island
Historic districts on the National Register of Historic Places in Rhode Island